The Catholic Church in Angola is composed of five ecclesiastical provinces and 14 suffragan dioceses.

List of dioceses

See also  
List of Roman Catholic dioceses in Africa

External links 
GCatholic.org.

Roman Catholic dioceses in Angola
Angola
Catholic dioceses